Bhasrala is a village in Jagat Tehsil, Budaun district, Uttar Pradesh, India. The Budaun railway station is located at the distance of 14 kilometer from the village. Hindi and Urdu are the main communication languages in the village. The village is administrated by Gram Panchayat.

References

Villages in Budaun district